The Virginian (otherwise titled  The Virginian: A Horseman of the Plains) is a 1902 novel by the American author Owen Wister (1860-1938), set in Wyoming Territory during the 1880s. It describes the life of a cowboy on a cattle ranch and is considered the first true fictional western ever written, aside from short stories and pulp dime novels, though modern scholars debate this.  The Virginian paved the way for many more westerns by such authors as Zane Grey, Louis L'Amour and several others.
The novel was adapted from several short stories published in Harper's Magazine and the Saturday Evening Post between Nov 1893 and May 1902.

Fictional character
The Virginian is a ranch hand at the Sunk Creek Ranch, located outside of Medicine Bow, Wyoming. His friend Steve calls him "Jeff" presumably after Jefferson Davis, but he is always referred to as the Virginian, and no name is mentioned throughout the story. He is described as a tall, dark, slim young giant, with a deep personality. At first, he is only a cowboy, but halfway through the book, he is signed on as the full-time foreman. He is the Judge's most trusted worker. Several times throughout the book, he is offered the chance to run down his enemy, Trampas, behind his back, but each time he refuses the temptation, until Trampas challenges the Virginian to a duel. It is made clear that he will not use his official position as foreman to crush any of his employees.  One of the main plots is the Virginian's ongoing romance with the newly appointed "schoolmarm" of Bear Creek School, Miss Molly Stark Wood. Being from the East, she is not used to the wild West, and the Virginian is a perfect gentleman to her, intending to make her "love him before we get through."

Plot summary

The novel begins with an unnamed narrator's arrival in Medicine Bow, Wyoming, from "back East" and his encounter with an impressively tall and handsome stranger. The stranger proves adept at roping horses, as well as facing down a gambler, Trampas, who calls him a "son of a bitch." The stranger lays a pistol on the table and gently threatens, "When you call me that, smile!"  Known only as the Virginian, the stranger turns out to be the narrator's escort to Judge Henry's ranch in Sunk Creek, Wyoming. As the two travel the 263 miles to the ranch, the narrator, who is nicknamed the Tenderfoot, and the Virginian come to know one another as the Tenderfoot slowly begins to understand the nature of life in the West, which is very different from what he expected. This meeting is the beginning of a lifelong friendship and the starting point of the narrator's recounting of key episodes in the life of the Virginian.

The novel revolves around the Virginian and the life he lives. As well as describing the Virginian's conflict with his enemy, Trampas, and his romance with the pretty schoolteacher, Molly Stark Wood, Wister weaves a tale of action, violence, hate, revenge, love, and friendship. In one scene, the Virginian is forced to participate in the hanging of Steve, an admitted cattle thief who had been his close friend. The hanging is represented as a necessary response to the government's corruption and lack of action, but the Virginian feels it to be a horrible duty. He is especially stricken by the bravery with which the thief faces his fate, and the heavy burden that the act places on his heart forms the emotional core of the story.

A fatal shootout resolves the ongoing conflict with Trampas after five years of hate. After Trampas shoots first in a duel, the Virginian shoots Trampas in self defense and leaves to marry his young bride. The Virginian and Molly ride off together to spend a month in the mountains and then journey back East to Vermont to meet her family. They are received a bit stiffly by the immediate Wood family, but warmly by Molly's great-aunt. The new couple returns to Wyoming, and the Virginian is made a partner of Judge Henry's ranch. The book ends noting that the Virginian became an important man in the territory with a happy family.

Cultural influence 
The 1902 novel had an enormous influence on publishing, and later movies and television, establishing the Western genre and especially the cowboy ideal as an American icon.  Its climactic gun duel is the first "showdown" in fiction.

The novel is also the first known use of the phrase: "When you call me that, smile!"  This line, in many versions, became common in later Western works, from movies to music.

Twenty-first century scholars of Western fiction debate whether The Virginian should be considered as the first cowboy novel outside the dime novel tradition. Victoria Lamont, for example, argues that this distinction belongs to The Administratrix by Emma Ghent Curtis (John B. Alden Publishing, 1889), which was published thirteen years earlier.

Adaptations

Stage
Wister and Kirke La Shelle adapted the novel for a stage production. The Virginian opened at the Manhattan Theatre on January 5, 1904, and ran until May 1904. It was reprised in October 1905 for 16 performances at the Academy of Music in New York City.

In 2022 playwrights L.C Bernadine and Spencer Huffman newly adapted the novel for City Lit Theater in Chicago. The production opened on January 16 2022 for a 5-week run.

Films
The Virginian (1914 film) directed by Cecil B. DeMille, with Dustin Farnum
The Virginian (1923 film) with Kenneth Harlan and Florence Vidor
The Virginian (1929 film) with Gary Cooper and Walter Huston
The Virginian (1946 film) with Joel McCrea and Brian Donlevy
The Virginian (2014 film) with Trace Adkins and Victoria Pratt

Television
The novel was loosely adapted for the NBC-TV series The Virginian (1962–1971).

The Virginian (2000 TV film) with Bill Pullman and Diane Lane

Comics 
The novel was adapted into comic form in Classics Illustrated #150. In 1963 Gold Key Comics published a single issue tie in with the television series.

References

 Graulich, Melody; Tatum, Stephen. Reading the Virginian in the New West. Lincoln, Nebraska: University of Nebraska Press, 2003. 
 The Pittsburgh Press, Nov 3, 1911
 The Scranton Republican, Dec 1, 1908

External links

 Owen Wister Papers at the University of Wyoming – American Heritage Center
Fifty years of The Virginian, 1902-1952 Laramie, University of Wyoming Library Associates, 1952.

The Virginian at Open Library
 
 The manuscript of The Virginian is preserved at the American Heritage Center at the University of Wyoming.

1902 American novels
Novels by Owen Wister
Western (genre) novels
Macmillan Publishers books
American novels adapted into films
American novels adapted into plays
American novels adapted into television shows
Novels set in the 1880s
Novels set in Wyoming
Novels set in Vermont
Fictional cowboys and cowgirls
Literary characters introduced in 1902